Robert DeHart Reynolds (born July 14, 1967) is an American former professional ice hockey winger who played seven games in the National Hockey League for the Toronto Maple Leafs during the 1989–90 season. The rest of his career, which lasted from 1989 to 2007, was mainly spent in the minor leagues.

Early life 
He was born in Flint, Michigan. As a youth, he played in the 1980 Quebec International Pee-Wee Hockey Tournament with a minor ice hockey team from Detroit.

Career 
During his NHL career, Reynolds played seven games in the National Hockey League for the Toronto Maple Leafs.

Career statistics

Regular season and playoffs

International

Awards and honors

References

External links

1967 births
Living people
AHCA Division I men's ice hockey All-Americans
American men's ice hockey left wingers
Baltimore Skipjacks players
Courmaosta HC players
Detroit Vipers players
EC KAC players
ECD Sauderland players
Flint Generals players
Houston Aeros (1994–2013) players
Ice hockey players from Michigan
Kalamazoo Wings (1974–2000) players
Lausanne HC players
NCAA men's ice hockey national champions
Newmarket Saints players
Ratingen EC players
Revier Löwen players
Sportspeople from Flint, Michigan
Toronto Maple Leafs draft picks
Toronto Maple Leafs players
ZSC Lions players